Murray Gainger (11 September 1939 – 31 May 1988) was  a former Australian rules footballer who played with Richmond in the Victorian Football League (VFL).

Notes

External links 		
		
		
		
		
		
		
		
1939 births		
1988 deaths		
Australian rules footballers from Victoria (Australia)		
Richmond Football Club players